

References and notes

Duchesses of Rohan-Rohan
Dukes of Rohan-Rohan
House of Rohan
Rohan